Michael Boyd or Mike Boyd may refer to:

 Michael Boyd (theatre director) (born 1955), British theatre director
 Michael T. Boyd, costume designer
 Mike Boyd (basketball) (born 1947), American basketball coach
 Mike Boyd (police officer) (born 1952), Canadian police officer and administrator